Mariam A. Aleem (28 December 1930 – 26 April 2010) was an Egyptian artist and art professor specializing in printed design. She received her Bachelor of Arts from the Faculty of Fine Arts Cairo in 1954 and her Master of Fine Arts in graphic printing 1957 from the University of Southern California. Beginning in 1958, Aleem taught printmaking at the Faculty of Fine Arts in Alexandria. In 1968 she became an assistant professor, heading the Printmaking Department. Aleem became a full professor in 1975 and led the Design Department from 1985 to 1990. She earned her Ph.D. in the history of art from Helwan University in Cairo. Aleem exhibited worldwide, with shows in the United States, Lebanon, Egypt, Germany, Italy, and Norway.

Notable awards
 Biennnial Norwegian Festival (1954)
 The National Order for Art and Science of the First Degree from Egypt (1974)
 International Year of the Woman from Egypt and Italy (1975)
 First Prize, Biennial Norwegian Festival (1984)

Selected exhibitions
 1954 Biennial Norwegian Festival
 1964 Venice Biennial, Venice, Italy
 1971 Aspects of Contemporary Egyptian Art (Visages de l'Art Contemporain Égyptien), the Musée Galliéra, Paris
 1984 International Exhibition of Graphics, Yokohama, Japan
 1987 International Graphics Exhibition, East Germany
 1991 Triennial, Finland
 1994 Forces of Change: Artists of the Arab World, the National Museum of Women in the Arts, Washington

Further reading
 
 Mariam Abdel Aleem, 1930-, Art & Artist files at the Warren M. Robbins Library, National Museum of African Art

References

1930 births
2010 deaths
20th-century Egyptian women artists
21st-century Egyptian women artists
Egyptian contemporary artists
Egyptian printmakers
Helwan University alumni
Artists from Alexandria
USC Roski School of Fine Arts alumni
Women printmakers